Capilla de Santa Ana (Llanes) is a church in Llanes, Asturias, Spain. The church was established in the 15th century.

See also
Asturian art
Catholic Church in Spain
Churches in Asturias
List of oldest church buildings

References

Churches in Llanes
15th-century establishments in Spain
15th-century Roman Catholic church buildings in Spain
Roman Catholic chapels in Spain